Asghar Talebnasab (born September 20, 1982) is an Iranian football player. He played for the IPL club PAS Hamedan as a midfielder.

External links
Persian League Profile

1982 births
Living people
Shahrdari Bandar Abbas players
Pas players
Sepahan S.C. footballers
Esteghlal F.C. players
Iranian footballers
Association football midfielders